Seoul Subway Line 8 of the Seoul Metropolitan Subway was built from 1990 to 1999 and mainly serves the southeastern parts of Seoul and Seongnam. The segment from Moran to Amsa was opened in July 1999. The line color is rose. In 2019, Line 8 had an annual ridership of 112 million or about 307,000 people per day.

In 2014, construction was planned to begin in order to extend the line north of the Han River through Guri station to Byeollae station on the Gyeongchun Line. The extension will add  of line to the already existing . Construction is set to finish in 2023. A further extension two stations north would bring the line to ByeollaeByeolgaram station on Seoul Subway Line 4. The southern end is planned be extended  to Pangyo station.

Stations

See also

Subways in South Korea
Seoul Metropolitan Rapid Transit Corporation
Seoul Metropolitan Subway

References

 
Seoul Metropolitan Subway lines
Railway lines opened in 1996
1500 V DC railway electrification